Highway 737 is a highway in the Canadian province of Saskatchewan. It runs from Highway 342 to Highway 42 near Greenbrier.

See also 
Roads in Saskatchewan
Transportation in Saskatchewan

References 

737